Roberto Limonta Vargas (born January 6, 1962) is retired male wrestler from Cuba. He represented his native country at the 1992 Summer Olympics in Barcelona, Spain. He won a gold medal twice at the Pan American Games.

References

External links
 sports-reference

1962 births
Living people
Wrestlers at the 1992 Summer Olympics
Cuban male sport wrestlers
Olympic wrestlers of Cuba
World Wrestling Championships medalists
Pan American Games gold medalists for Cuba
Pan American Games medalists in wrestling
Wrestlers at the 1983 Pan American Games
Wrestlers at the 1991 Pan American Games
Medalists at the 1983 Pan American Games
20th-century Cuban people
21st-century Cuban people